"The Story of Spring" is a patriotic Chinese song praising Chinese leader Deng Xiaoping, although it never mentions him by name. Originally sung by famous Chinese folk singer Dong Wenhua, Deng is referred to as "an old man" throughout the song. Its two verses allude to Deng's economic reform policies and their success from its inception in spring 1978 to his southern tour in spring 1992, when the song was created.

The song was widely played during the 1990s and is now a familiar tune to most Chinese people living on the mainland. It was especially widely played following Deng's death and was a feature performance at the 1997 CCTV New Year's Gala.

External reference 
 The Story of Spring on Yinyuetai
 The Story of Spring on YouTube

Cultural depictions of Deng Xiaoping
Chinese patriotic songs
Songs about politicians
1992 songs